The 1999 Pan American Games were held in Winnipeg, Manitoba, Canada and surrounding area. The Pan American Games ran from July 23 to August 8, 1999.

Planning
A total of 32 sporting venues were used for the games. The Pan Am Pool, built for the 1967 games, featured in the 1999 games for all aquatic events. The venue underwent a $3.3 million renovation for the games. Other new venues included the $8.7 million Investors Group Athletic Centre built for multiple sports and the $12 million CanWest Global Park for the baseball competition.

The main stadium for the games was the Winnipeg Stadium, which staged the ceremonies and the beach volleyball competitions.

A portion of the Pan American Games Society (1999) budget supported the refurbishment of University of Manitoba campus residences to serve as the Athletes Village, the upgrade of various sport and training facilities including the Pan Am Stadium (University Stadium), which had hosted events of the 1967 games.

The Winnipeg Velodrome, also built for the 1967 games, had become obsolete and disused for cycling and so was demolished prior to the 1999 games.  The 1999 games used a temporary facility at Red River Exhibition Park.

Winnipeg venues

Venues outside of Winnipeg

Map of host cities/towns

References

 
Venues of the Pan American Games